Talia Sahid is a fictional character from ABC's daytime drama One Life to Live.  She is portrayed by BethAnn Bonner.

Casting
Starting on June 8, 2006, Bonner was a participant in  the SOAPnet reality series I Wanna Be a Soap Star 3, in which contestants compete in various acting challenges for a 13-week contract role on a daytime drama. Bonner finished in third place. The winner, Mike Jerome, went on to portray Ted Osbourne on One Life to Live from August 11, 2006, to November 2, 2006, when the character was killed off. One Life to Live subsequently offered Bonner the role of Talia, a police officer involved in the investigation of Osbourne's death. The character was originally to be named Rhonda, but when the show's writers determined that she would be investigating the hate crime/arson case, they decided to add more depth to the character by making her an ethnic minority. The character was renamed Talia, and she became an Arab-American with a Syrian father.

Character history
Talia is introduced in 2006 as a Llanview police officer investigating an arson in which a man had been killed. She begins working closely with Detective Antonio Vega, with whom she forms and easy friendship and shares her experiences as a member of New York City Police Department on duty in Lower Manhattan on the day of the September 11 attacks. In late March 2007, Talia, Antonio, and Acting District Attorney Evangeline Williamson figure out that the string of arsons plaguing Llanview are being perpetrated by a white supremacist group known as "One Pure People". In May 2007, the Syrian Talia, Antonio's Latino brother Cristian, African American Evangeline and Jewish returning District Attorney Nora Hanen are gassed by OPP at Cristian's loft apartment. All survive the attack with few ill effects except Evangeline, who is left comatose. The investigation finally reveals celebrity baseball player Tate Harmon to be the ringleader behind OPP. Talia shoots and arrests him before he murders several hostages.

Antonio announces his divorce from Jessica Buchanan in the summer of 2007. After months of working side by side with him, Talia has developed a secret crush on her commanding officer Antonio and become close to his family and his young daughter Jamie. The reserved Talia is determined to not let on how she feels, believing that Antonio is reeling from the end of his marriage, and that any romantic tension would ruin their friendship and their professional relationship. Eventually Talia spends Thanksgiving 2007 with Antonio and his family, during which she shares a sensual dance with him in his mother's diner. An uncharacteristically impulsive Talia risks kissing Antonio and confessing her feelings for him. Antonio, still hurt after his divorce, rebuffs her advances politely; a humiliated Talia leaves. Their personal and professional relationship begins to disintegrate, and after a few awkward exchanges at work, Talia requests a transfer to the quiet neighboring township of Cherryvale. Antonio and Talia argue over her transfer, but Police Commissioner Bo Buchanan reluctantly agrees to her request.

Antonio soon realizes that he is only waffling about his feelings for Talia out of fear of being hurt again and decides he cannot pass up this opportunity for true love. On New Year's Eve, he races to meet her at the bus station, takes her in his arms, and passionately kisses her. Talia agrees to give Antonio a second chance at pursuing a tentative romantic relationship and happily stays in Llanview. Unfortunately, when the two officers return to work, Bo informs Talia that despite her change of heart, the work transfer is final and she is expected to report to Cherryvale immediately. Talia and Antonio resolve to continue their long-distance relationship as best they can on their "off-hours", but their work schedules prove more and more incompatible. Talia eventually switches places with Antonio's new partner, Oliver Fish, and transfers back to Llanview. She and Antonio resume their romance, but they soon choose sides against each other over the new police commissioner, renegade former FBI agent Lee Ramsey. Antonio remains loyal to Ramsey while Talia and Detective John McBain do not trust him; Antonio and Talia break up publicly when it becomes clear that she and John have slept together. As Ramsey comes to trust Antonio and take him into his confidence, it is revealed that the breakup had been a ruse concocted by Antonio, John, and Talia to entrap Ramsey. The Commissioner enlists Antonio in his plot to steal the Crown Jewels of Mendorra while they are in police custody but is murdered on June 12, 2008, before he can be brought to justice.

On June 26, 2008, Talia inexplicably aids Jonas Chamberlain, the Ambassador to the U.S. from the European principality of Mendorra, in kidnapping her roommate Sarah Roberts. Soon Antonio and Cristian discover that Jonas has both women; they and Sarah's mother Tina Lord — who had been posing as the Crown Princess of Mendorra  — agree to accompany Jonas back to Mendorra in order to make an exchange: Sarah and Talia for the Crown Jewels which Tina has in her possession.

In Mendorra, villain Carlo Hesser is revealed to be Talia's estranged father, and the real mastermind behind the kidnappings. Born Talia Cosima Hesser, she is Carlo's youngest child; during her early childhood, she had lived under Carlo's tyrannical rule, tormented by her demented siblings, Johnny Dee and Charlotte. Eventually, Talia had escaped from Carlo with her mother, who remarried a hardworking Syrian man. Taking her stepfather's last name "Sahid," Talia had eventually gone into law enforcement for the express purpose of repudiating all the evil done by Carlo, and in the hopes of eventually bringing him to justice.

Talia despises Carlo, a longtime enemy of both Tina and the Vega brothers. Carlo intends to force Talia to marry Jonas, the true heir to the throne and Carlo's puppet. Talia protests and stalls, but goes through with the royal wedding on July 31, 2008 to save Antonio and her friends from harm — not knowing that Jonas has already stabbed Antonio and left him for dead. A wounded Antonio appears, overpowers Jonas and the guards and leads Talia to safety, but Carlo, Jonas and their men catch up. Talia brokers a deal with Carlo: she will stay if the others are allowed to leave. With several people's lives at stake, a furious Antonio is forced to leave Talia behind. Antonio, Sarah and Cristian later return; they drug Carlo and Jonas and stage them in bed together, and Talia leads a team of reporters to "discover" the scene. With a protesting Carlo and Jonas arrested for fraud, Talia and the others leave Mendorra.

While investigating a string of murders, Talia goes to Dorian Lord's house to bring in John McBain for questioning; with a fellow officer ringing the doorbell, she searches the back of the house and is stabbed in the front torso by the "Llanview Slasher" (later revealed to be Powell Lord III) on April 17, 2009. John subsequently finds her body floating face down in Dorian's swimming pool. Talia's photo is hung on the police station's wall of fallen officers.

References

External links
 Talia Sahid profile – ABC.com (archived)

One Life to Live characters
Fictional police officers